Paul Croft (born 11 March 1951) is an Australian arm amputee athlete who has participated in four Summer Paralympic Games. He was the Australian team captain and flag bearer at the 1988 Seoul Paralympics.

Personal
Croft was born on 11 March 1951 in Sydney. He was a TAFE business studies teacher in Sydney. In 1992, he was Liverpool Citizen of the Year.

Paralympics career

His first Summer Paralympics was at the 1984 New York Paralympics, where he finished seventh in the Men's 1500m A6 and fourth in the Men's 5000m A6. At the 1988 Seoul Paralympics, he was appointed the Australian team captain. He participated in two sports. In athletics, he finished sixth in the Men's 10000m A6A8A9L4 despite an Achilles tendon injury. In table tennis he competed in the Men's Singles TT7 but do not progress past the preliminary round. At the 1992 Summer Paralympics, he finished seventh in the Men's 10000 m TS4. Croft qualified for the marathon at the 1996 Atlanta Paralympics but was not selected due to the size of the team. At the 2000 Sydney Paralympics, at the age of 49, he was a member of the Australian sitting volleyball team. Croft had tried out for the standing volleyball team but transferred to sitting volleyball after he realized he was unlikely to be selected. He was originally not selected in the sitting volleyball team but fought to have the decision overturned. He ran a leg of the Sydney Paralympic Games Torch Relay.

In his post Paralympics career, Croft has been coaching at the Bankstown Sports Athletics Club and a regular swimmer. He has had three knee reconstructions and a serious push bike accident.

References

External links
Paul Croft at Australian Athletics Historical Results

Living people
1951 births
Paralympic athletes of Australia
Athletes (track and field) at the 1984 Summer Paralympics
Athletes (track and field) at the 1988 Summer Paralympics
Athletes (track and field) at the 1992 Summer Paralympics
Table tennis players at the 1988 Summer Paralympics
Volleyball players at the 2000 Summer Paralympics
Long-distance runners with limb difference
Australian amputees
Australian male long-distance runners